Molly E. Molloy (Massachusetts, April 4, 1940 – New York, June 15, 2016) was an American dancer, choreographer and teacher who worked internationally. She was based in Paris, New York and London and was the originator of the Molloy Technique of Jazz Dance, a form of Modern American Jazz which she notably taught to choreographer Arlene Phillips and her troupe Hot Gossip.

Early life

Family tree 
Molloy was a fourth-generation dancer, but the first woman. Her great-grandfather was a dancer of Irish dancing as well as tap. Her grandfather was part of a dance team who did Irish dancing, tap and clog. Molloy's grandparents and all of their brothers and sisters all played musical instruments, and most of them danced. Her father (one of six children) along with his twin brother was a member of the "Molloy Twins" or "Molloy Boys," and worked in vaudeville and variety theater.

Childhood 
When Molloy was five, the family moved to New York. Against her mother's wishes, her father and uncle took her all over New York to their agents. But at her mother's insistence, Molloy trained in New York at the Metropolitan Opera Ballet School on full scholarship and was a protégée of Anthony Tudor at eight years old. She went on to study at the High School of Performing Arts and by the age of 14, was dancing professionally.

Choreography/Direction

Theatre 
When it came to theatre, from 14 May 1986 to 8 April 1989, Molloy was the Choreographer for Chess, the musical by Benny Andersson, Björn Ulvaeus and Tim Rice at the Prince Edward Theatre in London.

Cabaret 
She choreographed cabaret numbers at the legendary Crazy Horse theater in Paris from 1983 until her death. Molloy also choreographed 'La Difference' and 'One of a Kind', the Yvonne Constant Shows, as an artistic consultant from 1997 onwards. She choreographed many revues at the Paradis Latin in Paris from its re-opening in 1977, working with owner/producer Jean Kriegel and director Jean-Marie Riviere as well as dancers from all over the world. From November 2005 to September 2008, Molloy was the choreographer of 'Paradis d'amour' at Le Paradis Latin in Paris. She became the choreographer for L'Ange Bleu after one of her students at La Salle Pleyel in Paris introduced her to the French cabaret producer and director Jean Marie Riviere.

Circus 
She worked with Gifford's Circus, too, as the English Tour Dance Director on "Yasmine" in 2010 and Caravan in 2008.

Dance 
In 2005, Molloy choreographed on the World Tour of 'Celtic Tiger', the Michael Flatley Show.

From 2012, Molloy worked with Andy Black to choreograph 'Follow The Faun' which ran from 31 October to 12 November in London's Above the Arts Theatre.

Cinema 
Molloy was also involved in film choreography for the French cult classic, La Cité de la peur, which was released in 1994. She masterminded the famous scene in which the protagonists played by Gérard Darmon and Alain Chabat dance "La Carioca". She also worked on the sets of the thrillers Tati Danielle (1990) and Agatha (1979).

Concerts, tours and TV specials 
Molloy was the UK choreographer for Kylie Minogue's ITV Special and a TV Special in France named Sheila (TV Special) and Patricia Kaas. She also worked for Johnny Hallyday as the European Tour choreographer on his Heart and Fist tour. Molloy also choreographed the Summer Concert in Holmenkollen Oslo Philharmonic.

Teaching
Molloy taught at the Royal Ballet School London and the Paris Opera Ballet School where she was Professor Emeritus, as well as teaching the Oslo Dance Ensemble.

Jazz teaching 
Molloy taught jazz in many dance schools around the world including Pineapple Dance Studios in London, London Studio Center, Italia Conti, Broadway Dance Center in New York, Steps on Broadway in New York as a Guest Teacher, DanceWorks, Jazz Fests in Costa Rica as a Guest Teacher, the Boston Youth Moves Master Classes, the Salle Pleyel and Paris Centre.

Death 
Molly Molloy died of lung cancer, aged 76, in June 2016 in New York City.

References

Further reading

1940 births
2016 deaths
American jazz dancers
American choreographers
People from Pittsfield, Massachusetts
American female dancers
American dancers
Date of death missing
21st-century American women